The Acre Subdistrict ( Qadaa Akka,  Nefat Akko) was one of the subdistricts of Mandatory Palestine. It was located in modern-day northern Israel, having nearly the same territory as the modern-day Acre County. The city of Acre was the district's capital.

The subdistrict was transformed into Northern District's Acre Subdistrict.

Borders
 Safad Subdistrict (East)
 Tiberias Subdistrict (East)
 Nazareth Subdistrict (South)
 Haifa Subdistrict (South West)
 Lebanon (North)

History of attachment to a district

The layout of the districts of Mandatory Palestine changed several times:
 1922 Northern District
 1937 Galilee District
 1939 Galilee and Acre District
 1940 Galilee District
 1948 dissolution

The territory is now covered by the Northern District of Israel.

Depopulated towns and villages

(current localities in parentheses)

 Amqa (Amka)
 Arab al-Samniyya (Ya'ara)
 al-Bassa  (Betzet, Rosh HaNikra, Shlomi, Tzahal)
 al-Birwa (Ahihud, Yas'ur)
 al-Damun (Yas'ur)
 Dayr al-Qassi (Abirim, Elkosh, Mattat, Netu'a)
 al-Ghabisiyya (Netiv HaShayara
 Iqrit (Even Menachem, Goren, Shomera)
 Khirbat Iribbin (Adamit, Goren)
 Khirbat Jiddin (Ga'aton, Qiryat, Yehiam)
 al-Kabri (Ein Ya'akov, Ga'aton, Kabri, Ma'alot-Tarshiha, Me'ona)
 Kafr 'Inan (Kfar Hananya)
 Kuwaykat (Beit HaEmek)
 al-Manshiyya (Bustan HaGalil, Shomrat)

 al-Mansura (Abbirim, Biranit, Elkosh, Mattat, Netu'a)
 Mi'ar (Atzmon, Ya'ad)
 al-Nabi Rubin (Even Menachem, Shomera, Shtula, Zar'it)
 al-Nahr (Ben Ami, (Kabri)
 al-Ruways 
 Sha'ab 
 Suhmata (Hosen, Tzuriel)
 al-Sumayriyya (Bustan HaGalil, Lohamei HaGeta'ot, Shomrat)
 Suruh  (Even Menachem, Shomera, Shtula, Zar'it)
 al-Tall  
 Tarbikha (Even Menachem, Shomera, Shtula, Zar'it)
 Umm al-Faraj (Ben Ami)
 Az-Zeeb (Gesher HaZiv, Sa'ar)

District of Acre
Subdistricts of Mandatory Palestine
States and territories established in the 19th century